Granzella Inc. is a Japanese video game developer based in Ishikawa, Japan. The company is formed from former Irem staff and engaged in planning, production and sales of console games. The company is known for developing the latest entry in the Disaster Report and  R-Type series.
Granzella was established in April 2011 by former staff of Irem Software Engineering Inc. (hereafter referred as Irem) after the cancellation of multiple video game projects as a result of the 2011 Tōhoku earthquake and tsunami. The name of the company is derived from "Granzella Revolution Army," which appeared in R-Type Tactics II: Operation Bitter Chocolate, a game from the R-Type series developed by the staff at Irem.

After the company's establishment, Granzella mainly focused on developing content for PlayStation Home. On June 30, 2014, the company was split into two business divisions: "Granzella Inc." which focused on visuals and "Granzella Overseas Entertainment Inc." which focused on developing games for Western audiences and smartphones.

In December 2014, Granzella acquired IP and distribution rights of the Disaster Report series in all areas of the world, including future titles, from Irem. The company then announced the restart of development work for Disaster Report 4 Plus: Summer Memories, which was previously in limbo after Irem halted development of the game. Granzella also began distribution of previous Disaster Report titles on download services and arcades.

In September 2015, the company announced a joint project with Bandai Namco Entertainment, which eventually became City Shrouded in Shadow. The game was described as a spiritual successor to the Disaster Report series.

In November of the same year, the company announced the establishment of Gz Studios Inc., a video game development studio and Granzella Music, a music sub-label.

Games developed by Granzella

Notes

References 

Video game companies of Japan
Japanese companies established in 2011
Video game companies established in 2011
Companies based in Ishikawa Prefecture
Video game development companies